Champenois (lou champaignat) is a Romance language of the langues d'oïl language family spoken by a minority of people in Champagne and Île-de-France provinces in France, as well as in a handful of towns in southern Belgium (chiefly the municipality of Vresse-sur-Semois).

While it is classified as a regional language of France, it also has recognized status as a regional language in Wallonia, a region of Belgium. Champenois is considered an endangered language by the UNESCO Red Book of Endangered Languages.

Literature 
The language of Chrétien de Troyes is marked by Champenois traits and Rashi used Champenois in his commentaries, but the earliest literature to survive consciously written in Champenois is noted from the end of the 16th century. Le Bontemps de Carnaval de Chaumont was updated and republished in 1660. The language used contrasts the French spoken by the king's messengers with the Champenois of the local inhabitants. A feature of 18th century Champenois literature was the noëls (Christmas chants), which wove contemporary and local references into pious texts.

References

Further reading
 
 Paroles d'Oïl, DPLO, Mougon 1994,

External links

Oïl languages
Languages of France
Languages of Belgium
Walloon culture
Namur (province)